The Weaver Mercantile Building is a historic building in the unincorporated community of Weaver, Minnesota, United States, built in 1875.  It was listed on the National Register of Historic Places in 1978 for having local significance in the themes of architecture and commerce.  It was nominated for being one of the few surviving commercial buildings in the once-thriving Mississippi River community, and a well-preserved example of a form of commercial Italianate architecture popular along the river valley.

See also
 National Register of Historic Places listings in Wabasha County, Minnesota

References

1875 establishments in Minnesota
Buildings and structures in Wabasha County, Minnesota
Commercial buildings completed in 1875
Commercial buildings on the National Register of Historic Places in Minnesota
Italianate architecture in Minnesota
National Register of Historic Places in Wabasha County, Minnesota